Kaden Groves (born 23 December 1998) is an Australian cyclist, who currently rides for UCI WorldTeam .

Career
Groves was the 2016 winner of the junior race at the Australian National Road Race Championships. In 2017, Groves finished runner-up in the prologue stage of the Tour de Kumano. He won stage 3 of the Tour of Fuzhou.

In August 2019, Groves joined UCI WorldTeam  as a stagiaire for the second half of the season, before joining the team permanently in 2020. In 2022, he won his first Grand Tour stage, when he won stage 11 of the Vuelta a España in a sprint finish.

Major results

2016
 1st  Road race, National Junior Road Championships
2017
 1st Stage 3 Tour of Fuzhou
 1st Team time trial, Queensland State Road Championships
2018
 1st Stage 13 Tour of Qinghai Lake
 1st Stage 1 Tour of Quanzhou Bay
 3rd Overall Tour of China II
1st  Points classification
2019
 Le Triptyque des Monts et Châteaux
1st Stages 1 & 3
 1st Stage 1 Ronde de l'Isard
 2nd Eschborn–Frankfurt Under–23
 4th Overall Circuit des Ardennes
1st  Points classification
1st Stages 1 & 4
 8th Liège–Bastogne–Liège Espoirs
 10th Brussels Cycling Classic
2020
 Herald Sun Tour
1st Stages 3 & 5
 1st Stage 1 (TTT) Czech Cycling Tour
 4th Race Torquay
2021
 1st  Criterium, National Road Championships
 1st Prologue Okolo Slovenska
2022
 1st Stage 11 Vuelta a España
 Volta a Catalunya
1st  Points classification
1st Stage 2
 1st Stage 2 Tour of Turkey

Grand Tour general classification results timeline

References

External links

1998 births
Living people
Australian male cyclists
20th-century Australian people
21st-century Australian people